Fiumelatte may refer to:

 Fiumelatte (river)
 Fiumelatte (Varenna), frazione of Varenna, Italy